Talk of the Town is a 1995 German comedy film directed by Rainer Kaufmann.

Plot summary

Cast 
 Katja Riemann - Monika Krauss
 August Zirner - Erik Kirsch
 Martina Gedeck - Sabine Kirsch
 Kai Wiesinger - René Krauss
 Moritz Bleibtreu - Karl
  - Frau Krauss
  - Silke
  - Dieter Klump

Reception
The film was the second most popular German film in Germany for the year, behind Der bewegte Mann, with a gross of 16.3 million Deutsche Mark ($9.9 million).

References

External links 
 
 
 

1995 films
1995 comedy films
German comedy films
1990s German-language films
1990s German films